SAO or Sao may refer to:

Places 
 Sao civilisation, in Middle Africa from 6th century BC to 16th century AD
 Sao, a town in Boussé Department, Burkina Faso
 Saco Transportation Center (station code SAO), a train station in Saco, Maine, U.S.
 SAO, the ICAO airline designator for Sahel Aviation Service, Mali
 SAO, the IATA airport code for airports in the São Paulo metropolitan area, Brazil
 Serb Autonomous Regions during the breakup of Yugoslavia
 São Paulo, the largest city in Brazil

Science 
 Smithsonian Astrophysical Observatory of the Smithsonian Institution in Cambridge, Massachusetts, U.S.
 Smithsonian Astrophysical Observatory Star Catalog, which assigns SAO catalogue entries
 Special Astrophysical Observatory of the Russian Academy of Science (SAO RAS)

Entertainment 
 Sword Art Online, a Japanese light novel series
 Sword Art Online (2012 TV series), an anime adaptation of the light novels
 Sao Sao Sao, a Thai pop music trio

Other uses 
 Sao (mythology), a nereid (sea nymph) in Greek mythology
 Sáo, a Vietnamese flute
 Sao (moon), a satellite of Neptune
 Sao, or Thao language, of the Thao people in central Taiwan
 São, the Portuguese word for saint
 Sao (စဝ်), an honorific used in Burmese names
 Chad national football team, nicknamed Sao
 Ligi Sao (born 1992), a New Zealand rugby league footballer
 Session-At-Once, a recording mode for optical discs
 Security Advisory Opinion, a U.S. visa decision-making process 
 Specified Associated Organisation, an organization of members of the British Liberal Democrats
 São Tomé and Príncipe

See also
 
 
 Sau (disambiguation)